Phrynorhombus norvegicus, the Norwegian topknot, is a species of turbot native to the northeastern Atlantic Ocean.  This species grows to a length of  SL.  This species is the only known member of its genus.

References
 

Scophthalmidae
Fauna of Norway
Fish of the North Sea
Norwegian topknot
Taxa named by Albert Günther